Ignacewo  is a village in the administrative district of Gmina Ślesin, within Konin County, Greater Poland Voivodeship, in central Poland.

Ignacewo was the site of two battles of the January Uprising between Polish insurgents and Russian troops. The First Battle of Ignacewo on May 8, 1863 was lost by the Poles, while the Second Battle of Ignacewo on June 9, 1863 ended in a Polish victory.

References

Ignacewo